Jesper Pierre Ljung (born 31 December 1973) is a Swedish football manager who currently serves as an assistant coach at BK Häcken. He is also a former professional footballer who played as a midfielder.

Early life
Born in Malmö, Ljung grew up in Ryssby in Ljungby municipality and eventually started his footballing career with Kalmar AIK Fotboll and debuted in the second division at the age of 16.

Club career 
Considered one of the best prospects in Sweden at the time, he later chose to join Helsingborgs IF due to their home crowd despite interest from the most successful Swedish clubs. After injury in 1997 and surgery in 1998, Ljung signed for Danish side Vejle BK to replace Denmark international Thomas Gravesen, who left for Hamburger SV in the German top flight.

In 2003, he signed for Raufoss IL in the Norwegian second division.

International career 
Ljung won a total of 45 youth caps for the Sweden U17 and U21 teams, and appeared once for the Sweden B team in a friendly game against Scotland B.

References

External links
 Jesper Ljung at Elite Football

Swedish footballers
Living people
1973 births
Association football midfielders
Helsingborgs IF players
Vejle Boldklub players
Landskrona BoIS players
Raufoss IL players
BK Häcken players
Swedish football managers
Swedish expatriate footballers
Expatriate footballers in Norway
Swedish expatriate sportspeople in Norway
Footballers from Malmö